RTL 2 is a Croatian commercial broadcaster with national availability, launched on 2nd January 2011. The station was supposed to launch in 2010, but however, the launch date was pushed to 2011, during the New Year’s Eve.

Programming aired by RTL 2

Series & Miniseries

Airing currently
 Anger Management (all seasons)
 Cold Case (all seasons)
 Criminal Minds (all seasons)
 Fringe (all seasons)
 How I Met Your Mother (all seasons)
 K.T.2 (all seasons)
 Krv nije voda (all seasons)
 Hawaii Five-0 (all seasons)
 House (all seasons)
 Rules of Engagement (all seasons)
 The Big Bang Theory (all seasons)
 Two and a Half Men (8 seasons)
 Will & Grace (all seasons)
 Without a Trace (all seasons)
 Zabranjena ljubav (all seasons)

Hiatus
 Chuck (seasons 1-2 aired)
 Cobra 11 (seasons 1-20 aired)
 Dexter (seasons 1-2 aired)
 Elementary (seasons 1-3 aired)
 Grey's Anatomy (season 1-11 aired)
 Jerseylicious (s1 aired)
 Keeping Up with the Kardashians (s1 aired)
 Modern Family (seasons 1-6 aired)
 Weeds (seasons 1-3 aired)

Ended
 8 Simple Rules (ended)
 According to Jim (ended)
 'Allo 'Allo! (ended)
 Aurora (ended)
 Bella Calamidades (ended)
 Better Off Ted (ended)
 Desperate housewives (ended)
 Dollhouse (ended)
 El Clon (ended)
 Everybody Loves Raymond (ended)
 Family Matters (ended)
 Koala brothers (ended)
 Looney Tunes (ended)
 Malcolm in the Middle (ended)
 Miami Vice (ended)
 Najljepše bajke svijeta (ended)
 Nip/Tuck (ended)
 Pasión de gavilanes (ended)
 Prison Break (ended)
 Southland (ended)
 Terminator: The Sarah Connor Chronicles (ended)
 Super Mario Bros (ended)
 The Ex List (ended)
 The King of Queens (ended)
 The War at Home (ended)
 'Til Death (ended)
 United States of Tara (ended)
 Without a Trace (ended)
 You Rang, M'Lord? (ended) Žene s broja 13 (ended) Reality and documentary shows 
Airing currently
 Pawn Stars (all seasons) Modern Marvels (all seasons) Storage Wars (all seasons) Storage Wars: Texas (all seasons) Top Gear (all seasons)Ended
 Ax Men (ended) Dallas SWAT (ended) Extraordinary Dogs (ended) Heston's Feasts (ended) Ice Road Truckers (ended) Life After People (ended) Police Camera Action! (ended) Ramsay's Kitchen Nightmares (ended)Croatian reality and documentary shows 
 Koledžicom po svijetu
 Mijau, vau!
 Mjenjačnica
 Punom parom
 Studio 45
 Učilica
 Večera za 5
 Survivor: Kostarika

 Sports 
 RTL Liga
 Formula One (race highlights)''
 Red Bull Air Race

See also

RTL Group
RTL Televizija

References

External links
Official Site 

RTL Group
Television channels and stations established in 2011
2011 establishments in Croatia
Croatian-language television stations
Mass media in Zagreb
Television channels in Croatia
Television channels in North Macedonia